Dong Hyun Kim (born September 1973) is a South Korean businessman and fast food restaurateur based in Canada, who founded the East Asian-inspired restaurant chains Wasabi, Kimchee, and Kimchee To Go.

Early life and career
Born in 1973, Kim moved to the UK in 1999. After market trading in Camden, London, he founded Wasabi in 2003, opening its first shop on London's Embankment. Capdesia took a minority stake in Wasabi in May 2019, and with Henry Birts appointed CEO in November 2019, Kim stepped back from active management at the business. He afterwards started the business concepts Pelicana and Kineya in London. After founding the company in 2003, he stepped away from the Wasabi business in 2021, stating he would be focusing on other business interests while remaining a minority shareholder and director.

References

1973 births
Living people
20th-century South Korean businesspeople